Sa'ad al-Din Masud ibn Umar ibn Abd Allah al-Taftazani also known as Al-Taftazani and Taftazani (1322–1390) was a Muslim Persian polymath.

Early life and education

Al-Taftazani was born in 1322 in Taftazan, Khorasan in Iran, then in the Sarbedaran state.  He completed his education in various educational institutions in the cities of Herat, Ghijduvan, Feryumed, Gulistan, Khwarizm, Samarkand and Sarakhs. He mainly resided in Sarakhs. He was active during the reign of Timur, who noticed him as a promising scientist and supported his scholarship, and was part of his court. Ibn Hajar al-Asqalani famously remarked about him that "science ended with him in the East" and "no one could ever replace him". He died in Samarkand in 1390 and was buried in Sarakhs. He practiced and preached in the Hanafi and Ashari schools. He was of the Hanafi school in matters of Fiqh (Islamic jurisprudence) and an Ashari with regard to issues of Aqidah (Islamic creed).

Career

During his lifetime, he wrote treaties on grammar, rhetoric, theology, logic, law and Quran exegesis.  His works were used as textbooks for centuries in Ottoman madrasahs. and are used in Shia madrasahs to this day. He completed "Sharh-i az-Zanjani" which was his first and one of his most famous works at the age of 16.  He also wrote a commentary of the Qur'an in Persian and translated a volume of Sa'adi's poetry from Persian into Turkish.  But it was in Arabic that he composed the bulk of his writing.

His treatises, even the commentaries, are "standard books" for students of Islamic theology and his papers have been called a "compendium of the various views regarding the great doctrines of Islam".

Legacy

Ibn Khaldun said of him: 

I found in Egypt numerous works on the intellectual sciences composed by the well-known person Sa'd al-Din al-Taftazani, a native of Herat, one of the villages of Khurasan. Some of them are on kalam (speculative theology) and the foundations of fiqh and rhetoric, which show that he had a profound knowledge of these sciences. Their contents demonstrate that he was well versed in the philosophical sciences and far advanced in the rest of the sciences which deal with Reason.

Writings by Al-Taftazani

Linguistics

 Sharh az Zanjani (aka. Serh ul Izzi fi't-Tasrîf, a.k.a. Sa'diyye). (738 A.H.). His first work.
 Al-Irsad (a.k.a. Irsad ul Hadi). (778 A.H.).
 al-Ni'am al-Sawabigh fi Sharh al-Nawabigh.

Rhetoric

 Al-Mutawwal  (747 A.H.).
 Al-Mukhtasar (a.k.a. Muhtasar ul Ma'ani). (756 A.H.).
 Sharh'u Miftah il Ulum (a.k.a. Mirtah il Ulum). (787 A.H.).

Logic

 Sherh ur Risalet ash Shamsiyye (a.k.a. Sharh ush Shamsiyya). (752 A.H.).
 Maqasıd ut Talibin fi Ilmi Usul id-Din (a.k.a. Al-Maqasid). (784 A.H.).
 Tezhib ul Mantiq Wa al Kalam. (739 A.H.).
 Sharh al-'Aqa'id al-Nasafiyya (767 A.H.; commentary on Abu Hafs Omar al-Nasafi's creed).

Legal Sciences

 at-Talwih fi Kashfi Haqaiq at Tanqih  (758 A.H.).
 Hashiye tu Muhtasar il Munteha. (770 A.H.).
 Miftah ul Fiqh (a.k.a. Al-Miftah). (782 A.H.).
 Ihtisaru Sharhi Talhis il jami il Kabir. (785 A.H.).
 Al-Fatawa al Hanaffiya. (759 A.H.). A detailed compilation of his juristical decisions during his juristicaal career.
 Sharh ul Faraid is Sirajiyya.

Theology

 Sharh al-'Aqa'id al-Nasafiyya: This is a commentary on Abu Hafs Umar al-Nasafi's treatise on the creed of Islam. Taftazani's commentary on this work soon became the most acclaimed commentary. By 17th century, there were more than fifty further commentaries that were written on Taftazani's "Sharh 'Aqaid al-Nasafi".
 Hashiyye Ala  al-Kashshaf. (789 A.H.). This is an unfinished work of his.
 Al Arbain.
 Sharh ul Hadis ul Erbain en Neveviyye.
 Hashiyat al kashaf (extremely rare work by Taftazani) never finished by the scholar or unknown compiled during his lifetime. There are 3 manuscripts that have shed light on the subject and are known to the public in museums and private collections. One is dated 1147AH (private Saudi collection and is the oldest dated copy of his work some 357 years after his death), one dated 1209 AH, and one dated 1237AH.

See also
 List of Ash'aris and Maturidis
 List of Muslim theologians
 List of Iranian scientists and scholars

References

External links
 A selection of Taftazani's works at Library of Grand National Assembly of Turkey
 "Summary of Disagreements Between at-Taftazani and al-Jurrujani" is an Arabic work, dating from 1805, which compares Taftazani's work to the work of Abd al-Qahir al-Jurjani

Asharis
Hanafis
Shafi'is
Mujaddid
14th-century Muslim theologians
14th-century Iranian philosophers
Persian Sunni Muslim scholars of Islam
14th-century Persian-language writers
Date of death unknown
1322 births
1390 deaths
Scholars from the Timurid Empire
Critics of Ibn Arabi